Cambarus laconensis, the Lacon Exit cave crayfish, is a small, freshwater crayfish endemic to northern Alabama in the United States. It is an underground species known only from a single cave along the southern border of the Highland Rim in the southern Appalachians.

References

Cambaridae
Cave crayfish
Endemic fauna of Alabama
Freshwater crustaceans of North America
Crustaceans described in 2009